Tarchon may refer to:
 Tarchon the Elder, legendary founder of Tarquinii and the Etrurian League
 Tarchon the Younger, antagonist of Aeneas
 Tarchon, a speculative connection to the Anatolian deity Tarhun, Hurrian Teshub
 Mythical son of Hiera (mythology)
 Phoenician name for Tarragona
 A former genus name for a moth in the family Bombycidae, now Prothysana